Das Lied der Nacht ("The Song of the Night") Op. 23, is a 1926 German opera, or "dramatic ballad", composed by Hans Gál to a libretto by Karl Michael von Levetzow, premiered in Breslau in April of that year. The opera is set in twelfth century Palermo.

Recording
A 2018 CD recording was issued by the CPO label (555 186-2) with *Opernchor des Theaters Osnabrück, Osnabrücker Symphonieorchester, conducted by Andreas Hotz and the following singers in their respective roles:  
 Gritt Gnauck, alto – Fürstin-Äbtissin   
 Lina Liu,  soprano – Lianora, Erbprinzessin von Sizilien
 Susann Vent-Wunderlich soprano – Hämone, jüngere Folgedame
 Rhys Jenkins, baritone – Tancred, Vetter Lianoras
 José Gallisa, bass – Kanzler-Reichsverweser   
 Ferdinand von Bothmer, tenor – Bootsmann, Namenlose Sänger

References

Operas
1926 operas
Operas by Hans Gál
German-language operas
Operas set in Sicily